Griest is a surname. Notable people with the surname include:

Kristen Marie Griest, one of the first two women to graduate from the U.S. Army Ranger School
Stephanie Griest (born 1974), Chicana author and activist from South Texas
William Walton Griest (1858–1929), Republican member of the U.S. House of Representatives from Pennsylvania

See also
W. W. Griest Building, historic skyscraper located in the city of Lancaster, Pennsylvania